Rita Nzelu is a Nigerian veteran actress. She is known for her comic roles in most of her movies.

Early life and career
Rita Nzelu is a native of Ozubulu, Anambra State, Nigeria and attended University of Nigeria where she got her degree. Rita Nzelu rose to fame for her role as Tina, local prostitute in Living in Bondage. Since her rise to fame, she proceeded to act in over 100 movies.

She recently starred in Stigma of Womanhood (2016), Baby Mama (2017) and Wandering Soul (2017) as Patricia.

Personal life 
Rita Nzelu married Simeon Okoro in March 2004 and they relocated to the United Kingdom. They have two children. She reportedly separated from her husband in 2018.

Filmography 

 Unforgiven
 Back to Sender
 Agaba
 Angel of Darkness
 Baby Mama (2017)
 Wandering Soul (2017)
 Stigma of Womanhood (2016)
 Ada Mbano in London (2014)
 Ortega and His Enemies (2014)
 International Games (2012)
 Akpu-Nku (2003)
 Buried Alive (2003)
 Women Affair (2003)
 Holy Cup (2003)
 Long John (2002)
 Agumba (2002)
 Christian Marriage (2002)
 Beyond the Altar (2002)
 A Cry for Help (2002)
 Terrible Sin (2001)
 Never Comeback (2001)
 Awilo Sharp Sharp (2001)
 Ukwa (2000)
 Freedom (1999)
 Obstacles (1998)
 Blind Trust (1997)
 Nneka the Pretty Serpent (1994)
 Living in Bondage'' (1992)

References

External links 

Living people
Actresses from Anambra State
Igbo actresses
Nigerian actresses
Year of birth missing (living people)